"PDA" is the debut single by American rock band Interpol. It was released on August 22, 2002 as the first single from their debut studio album, Turn on the Bright Lights. The music video for "PDA" was directed by Christopher Mills. Unlike the two singles that followed; "Obstacle 1" and "Say Hello to the Angels" / "NYC",  "PDA" did not chart.

The song was nominated for a MTV2 award in 2003. The song is one of the oldest songs by Interpol and appeared on many of their early demos and EPs such as the band's first demo tape, the Fukd ID #3  EP, the Precipitate EP and the Interpol EP.

Music video 
The music video for "PDA" was directed by Christopher Mills.

Reception 
"PDA" was nominated for a MTV2 award in 2003 and is a playable track on Rock Band 2.

Track listing 
7" vinyl (OLE 546-7):

 "PDA" – 5:01
 "Specialist" – 6:40

Promo CD:

 "PDA" (radio edit) – 3:10

References 

2002 songs
2002 debut singles
Interpol (band) songs
Song recordings produced by Gareth Jones
Songs written by Carlos Dengler
Songs written by Paul Banks (American musician)
Songs written by Sam Fogarino
Songs written by Daniel Kessler (guitarist)